Jerald Wayne Mills (August 17, 1969 – November 23, 2013) was an American country musician, known for touring with the Wayne Mills Band for over 15 years and playing alongside Blake Shelton, Jamey Johnson and 2006 American Idol winner, Taylor Hicks. During his career, Mills released five studio albums (with a sixth unreleased) and two live albums. He also had seven Top 20 singles in Europe from 2008 to 2010, including a chart-topper in Belgium in 2009.

During his education at Wallace State Junior College in Hanceville, Mills played baseball and later at The University of Alabama football. He had a Bachelor of Science degree in Education.

In the early hours of November 23, 2013 in Nashville, Tennessee, Mills was shot in the head by a bar owner allegedly over an argument involving Mills lighting up a cigarette in a non-smoking area. He was rushed to a hospital, but later died. On March 6, 2015, Chris Ferrell was found guilty of second-degree murder in Mills' death and received a 20-year sentence with no possibility of parole. The verdict and sentence were appealed, but were upheld by the appeals court in 2019. Mills left behind wife Carol (they married in 2000) and seven-year-old son Jack.

In popular culture

Mills is the subject of the song "King of Alabama" by Brent Cobb.

Discography (with Wayne Mills Band)

References

1969 births
2013 deaths
American country singer-songwriters
Deaths by firearm in Tennessee
People from Arab, Alabama
Country musicians from Alabama
Singer-songwriters from Alabama